The 1995 German motorcycle Grand Prix was the fifth round of the 1995 Grand Prix motorcycle racing season. It took place on 21 May 1995 at the Nürburgring.

500 cc classification

250 cc classification

125 cc classification

References

German motorcycle Grand Prix
German
Motorcycle Grand Prix